Klay Hall (born September 11, 1958) is an American animator, storyboard artist, television director, and film director. 

Klay launched his animation career on Amazing Stories, Cool World, and Mighty Mouse: The New Adventures, before working as director on The Simpsons, and Family Dog. Klay later became supervising director of 89 episodes of King of the Hill at Film Roman.

Hall's first direction on a CG property was the series Father of the Pride, produced by DreamWorks Animation and animated at Imagi Studios.

In 2005 Hall was hired by DisneyToon Studios as story editor for their first CG feature, Tinker Bell (2008), followed by directing Tinker Bell and the Lost Treasure (2009), which was executive produced by John Lasseter and produced by Sean Lurie.

In 2013, Hall directed a Cars spin-off film at DisneyToon Studios, titled Planes.

Filmography (as a director)
 An American Tail - assistant animator; directed by Don Bluth
 Family Dog - "Family Dog Goes Homeless" (1993)
 Bobby's World - (7 episodes, 1993–1996)
 The Simpsons - "Natural Born Kissers" (1998)
 King of the Hill - (89 episodes; supervising director, 1997–2000)
 Father of the Pride (2004-2005)
 Tinker Bell and the Lost Treasure (2009)
 Planes (2013)

References

External links

1958 births
Living people
American animators
American animated film directors
American television directors
California Institute of the Arts alumni